Werner Roth (born April 4, 1948) is an American former professional soccer defender.

Mainly associated with the New York Cosmos, he also represented the United States men's national soccer team for three years. He is a member of the National Soccer Hall of Fame.

Soccer career
Born in Yugoslavia, Roth emigrated to the United States at age eight, going on to become a rising star in American soccer through the 1960s. He attended Brooklyn Technical High School, playing on the varsity squad from 1962 to 1966, and captaining the team in his senior year.

Additionally, he studied architecture at the Pratt Institute, and played for the German-Hungarians in the German American Soccer League.

One of the few Americans on a star-studded New York Cosmos side (i.e. Pelé, Franz Beckenbauer), Roth played with the club seven years, and helped it to Soccer Bowl titles in 1972, 1977 and 1978. He also appeared 15 times for his adopted country's national team, in the 1970s.

Movie career / Personal
Roth played Germany national football team captain Baumann in the 1981 movie Victory  (titled Escape to Victory in Europe), which also featured former Cosmos teammate Pelé, as well as Sylvester Stallone and Michael Caine. He was inducted into the National Soccer Hall of Fame in 1989.

In 2005, having been living in Brooklyn and Long Island for decades, Roth became engaged to soap opera actress Robin Mattson. The couple were married in June 2006.

Films

References

External links
NASL stats
National Soccer Hall of Fame profile

1948 births
Living people
Sportspeople from Brooklyn
Soccer players from New York City
American soccer players
Association football defenders
German-American Soccer League players
North American Soccer League (1968–1984) players
North American Soccer League (1968–1984) indoor players
New York Cosmos players
United States men's international soccer players
National Soccer Hall of Fame members
North American Soccer League (1968–1984) commentators
Yugoslav emigrants to the United States
Brooklyn Technical High School alumni